Viktor Kovács (born 27 December 1973) is a Hungarian sprinter specializing in the 100 metres.

He finished seventh with the Hungarian 4 x 100 metres relay team, which consisted of Kovács, Gábor Dobos, Roland Németh and Zsolt Szeglet, at the 1999 World Championships.

His personal best time over 100 m is 10.31 seconds, achieved in June 1998 in Budapest.

External links

1973 births
Living people
Hungarian male sprinters
Athletes (track and field) at the 2000 Summer Olympics
Olympic athletes of Hungary